Claude may refer to:


People and fictional characters
 Claude (given name), a list of people and fictional characters
 Claude (surname), a list of people
 Claude Lorrain (c. 1600–1682), French landscape painter, draughtsman and etcher traditionally called just "Claude" in English
 Madame Claude, French brothel keeper Fernande Grudet (1923–2015)

Places
 Claude, Texas, a city
 Claude, West Virginia, an unincorporated community

Other uses
 Allied reporting name of the Mitsubishi A5M Japanese carrier-based fighter aircraft
 Claude (alligator), an albino alligator at the California Academy of Sciences

See also
 Claud, a given name
 Claude's syndrome, a form of brainstem stroke syndrome